Stephen Preston may refer to:

Stephen Preston (flautist) (born 1945), English flautist
Stephen Preston (footballer) (1879–?), English footballer
Stephen W. Preston, American lawyer
Stephen Preston (cricketer) (1905–1995), English cricketer

See also
Steve Preston (born 1960), American businessman and civil servant